Dr. Necmettin Şeyhoğlu Stadium, is a football stadium in Karabük, Turkey.  It is mainly used for football matches and hosts the home matches of Karabükspor.  Starting from 2010, the stadium underwent renovations which finished at 2014. Each stand was demolished and rebuilt.

References

Football venues in Turkey
Multi-purpose stadiums in Turkey
Süper Lig venues
Sports venues completed in 1974
Kardemir Karabükspor
Sport in Karabük